XHATL-FM is a radio station in Atlacomulco on 105.5 MHz, owned by the government of the State of Mexico. It is part of the Radio Mexiquense state radio network.

Originally XEATL-AM 1520, the station signed on May 18, 1983 along with XEGEM-AM 1600 serving Toluca, XETUL-AM 1080 in Tultitlán and XETEJ-AM 1250 in Tejupilco. The station received permission to move to FM in 2012.

References

Radio stations established in 1983
Radio stations in the State of Mexico
Public radio in Mexico